William Ritter may refer to:

William Ritter (writer) (1867–1955), Swiss writer
William Emerson Ritter (1856–1944), American biologist

See also
Bill Ritter (born 1956), American politician
Bill Ritter (journalist) (born 1950), American television news anchor

Ritter, William